Double Yolk is a 1963 Australian television play. It adapts two short plays, "By Accident" and "With Intent". Both were by Hugh and Margaret Williams who had written The Grass is Greener.

By Accident
"By Accident" is set in Northampton. It is about an air force pilot Bill about to be promoted to squadron leader whose wife Jane worries he will be killed in action, as her father was.

Cast
Elspeth Ballantyne as Jane
Fred Parslow as Bill
Dorothy Bradley as Ann Brylerly
Leslie Wright as Jim Bailey

With Intent
"With Intent" is set in a house between Liverpool and Southport. It is about an invalid woman, Helen, who has a nurse, Miss Bennett (Joan Letch). The woman receives a letter from her husband Colin which was intended for another woman.

Cast
Keith Eden as Colin
Betty Berrell as Helen
Joan Letch as Miss Bennett
Edward Howell as doctor

Cast

References

External links
 

1963 films
1963 drama films
Australian drama television films
1963 television plays